To Da Max - Mistakes and Outtakes (1997-2004) is a compilation album by the band Pepper, composed of B-sides, demos, and live performances.

Track listing 

 The Arena (2000)
 New Beef (2001)
 Green Hell (Live) (2001)
 Armagideon Time (Live) (2002)
 Good Enough (Demo) (2003)
 Too Much (Demo) (2001)
 Blunt (1997)
 Stormtrooper (Demo) (2001)
 Wasting Time (2000)
 Dust On My Shoes (2001)
 Peanuts (2000)
 Danger, Danger (2003)
 New Sunday (2000)
 Lie Rumor Lie (2000)
 Lost (2000)
 2B (2004)
 Point and Shoot (Demo) (2003)
 Lucy (Demo) (2003)
 Medley (2005)
 Give It Up (Demo) (2001)

2007 compilation albums
Pepper (band) albums